Albert Melrose Calland III (born 1952) is a retired United States Navy Vice Admiral who was the deputy director for Strategic Operational Planning at the National Counterterrorism Center and commander of Naval Special Warfare Command from 2002 to 2004. He also previously served as Deputy Director of the Central Intelligence Agency from July 2005 to July 2006 and commanded the Naval Special Warfare Development Group from 1997 to 1999.

Calland is a former commander of Seal Team Six and was the first U.S. military flag officer to set foot in Afghanistan after the September 11 attacks.

Naval career
Calland graduated from the United States Naval Academy with a Bachelor of Science degree in 1974 and received a commission as an Ensign in the United States Navy. Calland received orders to Basic Underwater Demolition/SEAL training (BUD/S) at Naval Amphibious Base Coronado. After six months of training, Calland graduated with BUD/S class 82 in June 1975. His first operational assignment was with Underwater Demolition Team ELEVEN (UDT-11). Following SEAL Basic Indoctrination and completion of a six month probationary period, he received the 1130 designator as a Naval Special Warfare Officer, entitled to wear the Special Warfare insignia. Calland served as assistant platoon commander of a SEAL Delivery Vehicle (SDV) platoon till 1977. He later served as platoon commander at SEAL TEAM ONE from 1977 to 1981, phase instructor at BUD/S Training from 1981 to 1983, research, development and acquisition officer at Naval Special Warfare Group 1, and Naval Special Warfare/Explosive Ordnance Disposal Officer at Naval Surface Forces Pacific. Calland served as executive officer of Special Boat Unit 12 from 1986 to Apr 1988. He deployed as part of Operation Earnest Will in the Persian Gulf. Following his XO tour Calland was assigned as assistant chief of staff for research, development and acquisition at Naval Special Warfare Command from April 1988 to May 1990. He served at US Special Operations Command (SOCOM) at Tampa, FL from 1990 to November 1993. Calland became commanding officer of SEAL Team ONE from 1993 until January 1995. He later earned a Master of Science degree in national resource strategy from the Industrial College of the Armed Forces in 1996 followed by assignment as director of operations at Joint Special Operations Command. From June 1997 until June 1999, Calland commanded the Naval Special Warfare Development Group. Calland was the commanding officer of Special Operations Command Central (SOCCENT), part of United States Central Command, and as such, commanded efforts in Afghanistan in 2001 during Operation Enduring Freedom. Between August 2002 and March 2004, Calland served as the commanding officer of the Naval Special Warfare Command.
Calland's career at the Central Intelligence Agency began with his appointment to the position of associate director of Central Intelligence for military support in March 2004, a position he filled until his appointment as deputy director. Calland resigned from that position upon the confirmation of CIA Director General Michael Hayden, as a 1953 amendment to the National Security Act of 1947 prevents the director and deputy director from serving in the military simultaneously.

After leaving the CIA, Calland served for a year as deputy director for strategic operational planning at the National Counterterrorism Center (NCTC). He retired from the navy on July 1, 2007, after 33 years of service, becoming executive vice president for security and intelligence integration with CACI International Inc.

Awards and decorations

References

External links

Official Navy Biography

1952 births
Living people
People from Columbus, Ohio
United States Navy vice admirals
SEAL Team Six personnel
United States Naval Special Warfare Command
United States Naval Academy alumni
Dwight D. Eisenhower School for National Security and Resource Strategy alumni
Deputy Directors of the Central Intelligence Agency
Recipients of the Navy Distinguished Service Medal
Recipients of the Legion of Merit
Recipients of the Defense Superior Service Medal